The Auchentoroloy Terrace Historic District encompasses a residential district southwest of Druid Hill Park on the northwest side of Baltimore, Maryland.  It is roughly bounded by Auchentoroly Terrace, Reisterstown Road, Liberty Heights Avenue, and Fulton Avenue.  This area was developed between 1895 and 1911 with a series of large and fashionable townhouses, mainly in the Renaissance Revival style.  Development was begun by the heirs of John Morris Orem, and largely finished by the Auchentoroloy Corporation, which acquired land not developed by the Orems.

The district was listed in the National Register of Historic Places in 2015.

See also
National Register of Historic Places listings in North and Northwest Baltimore

References

Neighborhoods in Baltimore
Historic districts on the National Register of Historic Places in Baltimore